WEi (Japanese: ウィーアイ; pronounced "We-I") is a South Korean boy band formed by Oui Entertainment. The group consists of six members: Daehyeon, Donghan, Yongha, Yohan, Seokhwa, and Junseo. The group made their debut on October 5, 2020, with their extended play Identity: First Sight.

History

Pre-debut
Daehyeon and Donghan were contestants on the Mnet reality survival show Produce 101 Season 2. Donghan finished in 29th place, and Daehyeon in 83rd place. After the show, Donghan debuted in JBJ, while Daehyeon debuted in Rainz. Both groups were active for a period of time and each eventually disbanded in 2018. Donghan and Daehyeon then made their solo debuts in June 2018 and July 2019 respectively.

Seokhwa was a YG Entertainment trainee who participated in YG Treasure Box, but did not make it into the show's final debut lineup.

Yongha and Junseo were contestants in Under Nineteen and both became members of the debut lineup, finishing in 6th and 9th place respectively. They debuted as members of 1the9 on April 13, 2019, and officially disbanded as a group on August 8, 2020.

Yohan and Seokhwa were contestants in Produce X 101. Yohan represented Oui Entertainment, despite having only three months of training beforehand. Seokhwa competed as an individual trainee and was eliminated after finishing in 35th place. He signed with Oui Entertainment a month later, under Yohan's recommendation. Yohan finished in 1st place, and debuted as a member and the center of X1 on August 27, 2019. However, X1 disbanded on January 6, 2020, due to the Mnet vote manipulation investigation.

2020–2021: Debut with Identity series 
The group was announced in May 2020 by Oui Entertainment, through individual profile videos, under the temporary name OUIBOYS. The group's name was later announced to be WEi. They debuted with their first EP Identity: First Sight on October 5, 2020, with the lead single "Twilight".

On February 24, 2021, WEi returned with their second EP Identity: Challenge and its lead single "All Or Nothing".

On June 9, WEi released their third EP Identity: Action and its lead single "Bye Bye Bye".

On October 1, WEi released the promotional single "Starry Night (Prod. Dress)" through Universe Music for the mobile application, Universe.

2022–present: Love series, world tour, and Japanese debut
On March 16, 2022, WEi released their fourth EP Love Pt. 1: First Love and its lead single "Too Bad".

On July 18, WEi announced their first world tour FIRST LOVE: WEi WORLD TOUR in September. The group visited 15 cities in 6 countries, including Thailand, Japan, the United States of America, Canada, Mexico, and Chile.

On August 11, WEi made their Japanese debut with the mini album Youth and its lead single "Maldives".

On September 14, it was confirmed that WEi will make an official comeback in October. Their 5th mini album Love Pt. 2: Passion and its lead single "Spray" was released on October 19.

On December 10, WEi held a two-day fan concert Merry RUi Day, along with releasing a special Christmas album Gift For You.

Members
 Jang Dae-hyeon (장대현)
 Kim Dong-han (김동한)
 Yoo Yong-ha (유용하)
 Kim Yo-han (김요한)
 Kang Seok-hwa (강석화)
 Kim Jun-seo (김준서)

Discography

Extended plays

Singles albums

Singles

Videography

Music videos

Filmography

Web show

Concerts and tours

Concert

Awards and nominations

Notes

References

External links
  

2020 establishments in South Korea
Musical groups from Seoul
K-pop music groups
Musical groups established in 2020
South Korean dance music groups
South Korean boy bands